Mechanicsburg is an unincorporated community and census-designated place (CDP) in Bland County, Virginia, United States. As of the 2020 census, it had a population of 81.

The CDP is in eastern Bland County, along Virginia State Route 42, which leads west-southwest  to Bland, the county seat, and northeast  to Pearisburg.

References 

Populated places in Bland County, Virginia
Census-designated places in Bland County, Virginia
Census-designated places in Virginia